Dipsadoboa aulica, commonly known as the marbled tree snake, is a species of snake in the family Colubridae. The species is endemic to Africa, and is mildly venomous to humans.

Geographic range
D. aulica is found in Eswatini, Malawi, Mozambique, Somalia, South Africa, Tanzania, and Zimbabwe.

Description
D. aulica is a slender-bodied snake. Females are slightly smaller, growing to  SVL. The smooth dorsal scales are arranged in 17 rows at midbody.

Behavior
D. aulicus, is nocturnal and arboreal, hiding during the day in tree cavities or under bark.

Diet
D. aulica preys primarily upon tree frogs and geckos, but will also eat toads, skinks, and small rodents.

Reproduction
D. aulica, like all species in the genus Dipsadoboa, is oviparous. In midsummer sexually mature females lay 7-8 eggs. The eggs measure on average 25.5 x 11.5 mm (about 1 x 0.5 inch). Hatchlings measure on average 18 cm (about 7 inches) in total length (including tail).

References

Further reading
Boulenger GA (1896). Catalogue of the Snakes in the British Museum (Natural History). Volume III., Containing the Colubridæ (Opisthoglyphæ and Proteroglyphæ) ... London: Trustees of the British Museum (Natural History). (Taylor and Francis, printers). xiv + 727 pp. + Plates I-XXV. (Chamætortus aulicus, pp. 98–99).
Günther A (1864). "Report on a Collection of Reptiles and Fishes made by Dr. Kirk in the Zambesi and Nyassa Regions". Proc. Zool. Soc. London 1864: 303–314. (Chamætortus aulicus, new species, p. 310 + Plate XXVI, figure 2).

Reptiles described in 1864
Taxa named by Albert Günther
Colubrids
Reptiles of Malawi
Reptiles of Mozambique
Reptiles of Somalia
Reptiles of South Africa
Reptiles of Eswatini